The MP 51 (fr) was the first rubber-tyred metro prototype operated by the Régie autonome des transports parisiens (English: Autonomous Parisian Transportation Administration, RATP), on the Paris Metro system starting in 1951 fitted with GoA 2 ATO from the start. It ran with passengers from 13 April 1952 until 31 May 1956 and was used as a test bed for rubber-tyred metro technology and automatic train operation. It operated a quiet 770m shuttle service with sharp turns and steep grades on la voie navette of the Paris Métro. It featured a GoA 2 system with an ATO "mat" fitted onto the underfloor of the train continuously in contact with a guide-line between the tracks nicknamed "Grecque", and often prompted passengers to "operate the train" by pushing the ATO start button. Lack of funds prevented installation on the rest of the Paris Metro until 1966, starting with line 11. Line 14, opened in 1998, was the first newly built Paris Métro to operate in GoA 4, and Line 1 later also had its GoA 2 ATO system replaced to a newer GoA 4 CBTC system from 1972.

References

Transport in France

Paris Métro rolling stock